Thahir Zaman Kolochalil (born 10 May 1995) is an Indian professional footballer who plays as a winger for I-League club Gokulam Kerala.

Career

Gokulam Kerala F.C. 
Born in, Calicut, Kerala, India Zaman made his first professional appearance with Gokulam Kerala FC against Chennai City FC on 9 January 2021 as a substitute for Sebastian Thangmuansang in the 45th minute of the game. The match ended 1–2 to Chennai City F.C.

Career statistics

Club

Honours
Gokulam Kerala
I-League: 2020–21, 2021–22

Education 

 BA English- Farook College 2014–2017

References

External links 

 
 

1995 births
Living people
Indian footballers
I-League players
Gokulam Kerala FC players
Association football midfielders
Footballers from Kerala
People from Kozhikode district